Foronda is a town and council belonging to the municipality of Vitoria-Gasteiz, in the province of Álava (Basque Country, Spain). It is located at an altitude of 517 meters, bathed by the Zalla River.

Climate
This region experiences warm (but not hot) and dry summers, with no average monthly temperatures above 71.6 °F.  According to the Köppen Climate Classification system, Foronda has a warm-summer Mediterranean climate, abbreviated "Csb" on climate maps.

References

Populated places in Álava